Makiso  , formerly Stanley , is a commune  in the center of the city of Kisangani, the capital of Tshopo province, in the Democratic Republic of Congo .  It includes a shopping area.

References 

 Kisangani
Communes of the Democratic Republic of the Congo